Naïma Laouadi (born 15 February 1976) is an Algerian football former player and current manager. She played as a midfielder and has been a member of the Algeria women's national team.

Club career
Laouadi has played for Évreux AC and Celtic de Marseille in France.

International career
Laouadi capped for Algeria at senior level during two Africa Women Cup of Nations editions (2004 and 2006).

References

External links

1976 births
Living people
Footballers from Tizi Ouzou
Algerian women's footballers
Women's association football midfielders
Algeria women's international footballers
Algerian expatriate footballers
Algerian expatriate sportspeople in France
Expatriate women's footballers in France
Algerian football managers
Female association football managers
Women's association football managers
21st-century Algerian people